Swede is a nickname for:

 Carl Anderson (American football) (1898–1978), American college football head coach
 Swede Ellstrom (1906–1994), American National Football League player
 Geary Eppley (1895–1978), American university administrator, professor, agronomist, military officer, athlete and track and field coach
 Swede Hagberg (1907–1960), American National Football League player
 Swede Halbrook (1933–1988), American National Basketball Association player
 Andy Hansen (1924-2002), American Major League Baseball pitcher
 Tom Hanson (American football) (1907–1985), American National Football League player
 Swede Johnston (1910–2002), American National Football League player
 Swede Knox (1948–2021), Canadian hockey linesman
 Swede Larson (c. 1899–1945), 23rd head football coach for the United States Naval Academy
 Hugo Leistner (1902–2002), American hurdler
 Swede Masin (1920–2005), American multi-sport college athlete and professional basketball player
 Charles Momsen (1896–1967), American pioneer in submarine rescue and US Navy vice admiral
 Swede Nordstrom (1896–1963), American National Football League player
 Andy Oberlander (1905–1968), All-American football halfback
 Norman Ralston (1916–2007), American pilot, flight instructor and businessman
 Erwin Righter (1897–1985), college football and basketball player and coach
 Swede Risberg (1894–1975), American Major League Baseball player
 Swede Roos (1913–1979), American professional basketball player and coach
 Swede Savage (1946–1973), American race car driver
 Swede Vejtasa (1914–2013), American World War II flying ace
 Swede Youngstrom (1897–1968), American National Football League player

See also
 Tillie Anderson (1875–1965), Swedish-born American road and track cyclist known as "the Terrible Swede"
 John Lawson (cyclist) (1872–1902), Swedish-American professional cyclist known as "the Terrible Swede"
 Emory Parnell (1892–1979), American vaudeville performer and actor nicknamed "the Big Swede"

Lists of people by nickname